Kimballton is an unincorporated community in Giles County, Virginia, United States. Virginia Tech's Kimballton Underground Research Facility (KURF), a low-background physics laboratory, is located in a limestone mine in Kimballton.

References

Unincorporated communities in Giles County, Virginia
Unincorporated communities in Virginia
Underground laboratories